Frank Grant Menke (October 10, 1885 – May 13, 1954) was an American newspaper reporter, author, and sports historian. He wrote for the Hearst Newspapers from 1912 to 1932 and his articles appeared daily in 300 newspapers across the country. He was billed by the Hearst syndicate as "America's Foremost Sport Writer".  He later devoted much of his effort to his work as an author of books on sports history. Two of his works, The All Sports Record Book and The Encyclopedia of Sports, became known as authoritative reference works that were revised and reissued for several decades.

Early years
He was born in Cleveland, Ohio in 1885.  His father, Christopher J. Menke, was an Ohio native and a printer.  He worked in construction as a teenager and played semi-professional baseball as a pitcher and outfielder. From 1906 to 1911, he worked as a reporter for the Cleveland Press and the Cleveland News.

Sports writer and editor for Hearst newspapers
In 1911, Menke moved to New York and, in 1912, became a sportswriter for the International News Service (INS) the wire service for the Hearst newspapers.  He remained with the INS until late 1916 when he formed The Menke Syndicate, Inc.  By March 1917, Menke returned to the Hearst newspapers as a feature writer and sports editor for Hearst's Newspaper Feature Service, also known as the King Features Syndicate.  Menke's daily sports column appeared in 300 newspapers across the United States and Canada in the late 1910s and early 1920s and was translated into Spanish, French and Chinese for publication abroad.  He was billed by the Hearst newspapers as "America's Foremost Sport Writer" and the "'Babe Ruth' of the Scribes".  In 1931, Bill Ritt, sports editor of a competing syndicate, paid tribute to Menke:Should sports writers, in congress assembled, ever decide to award a medal to the scribe who has given the most meritorious service in behalf of his fellow laborers in the athletic vineyards, this department's nomination would be Frank G. Menke.  Menke for many years a nationally known sports writer, is also the Lincoln, the Bancroft, the Emil Ludwig, the Sherlock Holmes of sideline scribblers.

From 1913 to 1922, Menke's college football All-America team selections were published in newspapers across the United States.

From 1918 through the 1920s, Menke wrote about no athlete more frequently than Jack Dempsey.  The two became friends, and Menke was long a supporter of Dempsey.  In 1926, Dempsey went into the horse racing business and named a thoroughbred hose "Frank G. Menke" after Menke.

Menke spent one year as the editor of the New York Press in 1934.

Author
Menke also worked with Ty Cobb, Gene Tunney, and James J. Corbett on their autobiographies and ghost wrote articles for Babe Ruth.  In 1929, Menke published The All Sports Record Book, which was re-issued and updated annually throughout the 1930s.  In 1939, he published a new work, The Encyclopedia of Sports.  He thereafter published revised and expanded editions of his encyclopedia through 1953.  The final edition of The Encyclopedia of Sports published during Menke's lifetime was 1,018 pages. It was periodically updated with revised editions being published even after his death.  The sixth revised edition, published in 1978, covered 68 major sports in 1,125 pages.

As baseball prepared to celebrate the centennial of the sport in 1939, Menke released the results of his research showing that the sport was not invented in 1839 by Abner Doubleday in Cooperstown, New York.  Menke first published his findings in a magazine called Ken and then reprinted in the first edition of The Encyclopedia of Sports, which was released in February 1939.  Menke concluded that the game had been played along the East Coast since at least 1805 and pointed out that Doubleday was 20 years old and enrolled at a military academy when he was supposed to have invented the game.  While the quality of Menke's research was acknowledged by leading newspapers including The Sporting News, the Little Falls Times, a newspaper serving the Cooperstown area, wrote that Menke had an ulterior motive for his claims and belonged to "the class that would belittle Washington, Lincoln and other men who have played their part in American history".

In the late 1930s and 1940s, Menke worked for eight years as the publicity director for Churchill Downs, the home of the Kentucky Derby.  During his years working with Churchill Downs, he published several books about horse racing, including The Story of Churchill Downs and the Kentucky Derby (1940), Churchill Downs and the Kentucky Derby Since 1875 (1942), Down the Stretch: The Story of Colonel Matt J. Winn (1945), and Harness Horse History (1945).

Family and death
In May 1954, Menke died in his hotel room in Cincinnati, after suffering a heart attack while returning from a vacation in California to his home in Fairfield.

Articles by Menke

Baseball
Federal League Worries Fultz (Federal League), February 27, 1914
Baseball Good Revenue Getter: In Later Years Has Become Very Remunerative Business, March 3, 1914
Sport Dope (column about George Stallings and 1914 Boston Braves), September 30, 1914
Sport Dope (1914 World Series), October 8, 1914
In the World of Sport (1914 World Series), October 17, 1914
Sport Dope (column about peace talks with the Federal League), December 1, 1914
Sport Dope (highest baseball salaries), December 26, 1914
Sport Dope (proposal to play World Series in multiple cities), January 9, 1915
Sport Dope ("Wild Bill" Donovan), January 12, 1915
Sport Dope (Bill Hinchman/Battling Nelson), January 22, 1915
Sport Dope (National League pennant race), March 4, 1915
Sport Dope (National League Race), March 9, 1915
Tener Is New Czar In Baseball World (John K. Tener), February 8, 1916
Collins Has the Edge on Tris Speaker, Says Menke (Eddie Collins/Tris Speaker), April 30, 1916
American League Jockeyed With Entire Circuit Balanced, May 2, 1916
Cleveland Paid Too Much for Tris Speaker Thinks Expert Menke (Tris Speaker), April 18, 1916
Joe Jackson Is a Great Slugger, But Can Not Beat Cobb's Record (Shoeless Joe Jackson), June 17, 1916
Menke Declares Sox Will Win Series in Five Game Romp (1916 World Series), October 8, 1916
Clout by Ty Cobb Causes a Divorce; Matty Gives Good Advice on Hurling (Ty Cobb/Christy Mathewson), July 20, 1918
John Heydler Is Right Man Head of Major League (John Heydler), November 27, 1918
Pitchers Finally Got Next to Babe Ruth's Slugging and His Average Began to Drop (Babe Ruth), April 27, 1919
Reds Lose Lead; Sox Come from Behind (1919 World Series), October 7, 1919
One More Defeat and White Sox Dream Are Ended (1919 World Series), October 7, 1919
White Sox Take Another and Fatten Chances (1919 World Series), October 8, 1919
Stove Leaguers Don't Have To Select All-American Baseball Team -- It Picks Itself (1921 All-America Baseball Team), November 19, 1921
Menke Recalls Days When College Boys Found Going Rough, January 11, 1922
Legislative Folks Do Lot Of Vain 'Sloganing' Against Judge Landis: Baseball's Chieftain Merely Chuckles At 'Out With Landis' (Kenesaw Mountain Landis), January 24, 1922
Preponderance of Backstops Guiding Teams This Season (catchers as managers), February 22, 1922
'Showdown' Expected in Holdout Squabble: Fabulous Prices of Rookies Wreck Morale of Club, March 4, 1922
Gentle Barney Gets Hooked (Barney Dreyfuss), October 27, 1924
Aspiring Twirler Now Finds Curve Ball Necessary, April 20, 1923
Frank Frisch Luckiest of Ball Players (Frankie Frisch), October 22, 1924
Miller Huggins Made Hornsby a Hitter (Miller Huggins/Rogers Hornsby), December 26, 1924
Four Men Left of 1920 World Champions (1920 Cleveland Indians), January 3, 1925
Jack Dunn Is Genius Of Baseball World, Frank Menke Thinks (Jack Dunn), February 9, 1925
Chris Von Der Ahe's Baseball Party (Chris von der Ahe), June 5, 1925
$11,000 'Lemon' Pitching In All His Early Glory (Rube Marquard), July 17, 1925
Heydler's Advice to Jake Not Common Sense (John Heydler/Jack Fournier), November 25, 1925
Home for Indigent Players Aim of Diamond Fraternity, January 4, 1926
Tobacco Chewing Habit Caused Pennock Misery (Herb Pennock), October 15, 1926
Menke Predicts Yanks Will Flop Next Year (1927 New York Yankees), October 28, 1926
Landis May Be Ousted From Czar Post Next Year: Some Moguls Against His Appointment; Would Like to Know If He Is Worth $50,000 a Year (Kenesaw Mountain Landis), December 1, 1926
Menke Suggests Red Sox Sign Speaker, Collins, Cobb: Trio Sure To Bring Pennant To Bean Town; Tris and Ty Will Find It Hard to Resist Game, December 21, 1926
Menke Takes Rap at Landis as Sensation Seeker: Silver Thatch Busy Dodging Verbal Bricks; Scandal Has Rocked Ex-Jurist Like a Ship in a Storm (Kenesaw Mountain Landis), December 31, 1926
Menke Says Connie Mack No Longer 'Miracle Man': New Failures Show Players Brought Fame; Has Been Getting Sad Results for Last 13 Years (Connie Mack), July 27, 1927
Reilly Made Shrewd Deal When He Sold Delaney's Contract (Jack Delaney), January 5, 1928
Menke Figures Athletics To Capture World Series: Macks Have It On Cubs, He Asserts (1929 World Series), September 28, 1929
'Copper' Thinks Athletics Will Cop Big Crown (1931 World Series), October 7, 1931

Boxing
Wants Pugilists Better Governed: National Commission To Have Supervision Over Sport Is Proposed (advocating creation of a national boxing commission), February 3, 1914
Sport Dope (Jack Johnson/Jess Willard), January 8, 1915
Sport Dope (Battling Nelson), January 18, 1915
Sport Dope (Jack Johnson/Jess Willard), February 18, 1915
Menke Says Betting Favors Frank Moran (Frank Moran), October 19, 1915
Little Jack Dillon Springs Ring Surprise of Year -- Whales Frank Moran in Easy Fashion at Brooklyn (Jack Dillon), June 30, 1916
Scribe Says Fulton Afraid of Dempsey: Salt Lake Boy Earns Right To Contest (Fred Fulton/Jack Dempsey), March 19, 1918
Checkers Started Miske in Boxing (Billy Miske), July 20, 1918
Will Dempsey-Willard Go Be Staged? Frank Menke Not So Sure That It Will; Jess May Have Idea in His Madness (Jess Willard/Jack Dempsey), February 14, 1919
Championship Fight Between Willard and Jack Johnson Was Real Fake, Says Menke (Jack Johnson/Jess Willard), March 23, 1919
Dempsey Shuns Lady Nicotine But Falls for Sweet Stuff (Jack Dempsey), May 18, 1919
Beckett Proves To Be Over-Rated Boxer: So as Carpentier Licked Beckett, So Will Dempsey Trounce Georges in Ring, Menke Believes (Georges Carpentier/W. N. T. Beckett), December 13, 1919
Time to Lift Ban on Fight Movies, View of Menke (advocating repeal of federal law prohibiting moving pictures of boxing contests), April 25, 1920
Leight-Weight Family of the Heavy-Weight Champion: Why Has Jack Dempsey a Giant's Physique and Tremendous Powers of Endurance When His Parents, Sisters and Brothers Have Been Frail, Underweight or Invalids All Their Lives? (Jack Dempsey), January 30, 1921
Life Ceases To Be Bed of Sweet Scented Roses for America's Thumb Ipressario (Tex Rickard), November 10, 1921
Clique Combine Against Rickard May Result in Repeal of New York's Boxing Law: Fist Slingers Let Money-Mad Managers Gamble Meal Tickets (Tex Rickard), November 29, 1921
Heavyweight Champion More Apt To Be Beaten By Smaller Opponent, December 27, 1921
Thump Impressario [sic] Insists That Champ Box At 135 Pounds (Benny Leonard), January 4, 1922
Fistic Champions Take Turns In Playing Title Role In 'The Dodgers': Ring Bosses Would Rather Loaf Than Fight Tough Ones, February 2, 1922
'Battling Bill' Brennan Reads Paper and Promptly Faints: Scorer of 60 Kayo Victories Told To Go and Secure 'Rep' (Bill Brennan), March 18, 1922
Dempsey In Loud Clothes: Champ Doesn't Understand Why Frank Menke Doesn't Appreciate His Remarkable Toggery (Jack Dempsey), July 2, 1922
Havana Logical Scene of Dempsey-Wills Go, Says Meinke (Jack Dempsey/Harry Wills), November 22, 1922
Langford Had To 'Pull' Punches To Get Bouts Asserts Menke (Sam Langford), April 28, 1923
Dual Plan Behind Bout: Shelby Affair Merely Means to Ballyhoo Dempsey-Wills Engagement (Dempsey vs. Tommy Gibbons), June 2, 1923
Dempsey-Gibbons Bout West's Lone Topic of Conversation (Dempsey vs. Gibbons), June 13, 1923
Firpo Deserves Royal Welcome by His Countrymen (Luis Firpo, "The Wild Bull of the Pampas), September 29, 1923
Wills Will Never Get Crack At Title Held By 'Jack' Dempsey (Harry Wills), October 1, 1923
Harry Greb Reckless At Spouting Charges In Newspapers (Harry Greb), January 8, 1924
Montana Comes Back Despite Ring Bloomer (Dempsey vs. Gibbons), October 25, 1924
Johnson's Ring Fame Due To Wild Blow (Jack Johnson), November 1, 1924
Flowers Finds Himself in Tough Spot (Tiger Flowers), January 5, 1925
Menke Sees Mystery In Terrific Punch of Jack Delaney (Jack Delaney), February 4, 1925
Jack Dempsey Will Never Fight Harry Wills (Jack Dempsey/Harry Wills), April 9, 1925
Benny Leonard's Old Pals Gone to Bow-wos (Benny Leonard), October 7, 1925
Dempsey Today Is Better Than Ever, Says Menke (Jack Dempsey), November 13, 1925
Walker Draws Up Smart Deal with Kearns (Mickey Walker/Jack Kearns), November 27, 1925
'Wife of Champ Has No Easy Life,' Jack's Estelle Sighs (Jack Dempsey), January 6, 1926
Scramble to Groom Next Heavy Champ Under Way, April 30, 1926
Menke Defends Dempsey, Declares Champ Is Fit (Jack Dempsey), June 26, 1926
Quitting Mix When Beat Not Sign of Yellow, July 20, 1926
Menke Sees Little Logic In Harry Wills' Claims, August 10, 1926
Dempsey of Old Will Be In Ring, Menke Declares (Jack Dempsey vs. Gene Tunney), September 18, 1926
Menke Says Dempsey Forgot Famous Shift (Dempsey vs. Tunney), September 29, 1926
Marines Have Another One Looking for Title (Albert Foreman), October 16, 1926
Monte Munn Abandons Politics for Squared Ring: Begins Battle For Ring Fame at 28 Years; Grid Star Shows Promise, But Has Only Met Punks (Monte Munn), November 1, 1926
Menke Warns Fighters to Ignore Greeley's Advice: Many Champs Hit for West and Oblivion, December 13, 1926
Sport World Reluctant to Accept Tunney as Champ: Bumped Over Gibbons, Carp and Dempsey; Beat 'Em All as They Came Along, Yet Is Not 'Accepted' (Gene Tunney), December 20, 1926
Only Four Contenders Remain for Tunney's Title: Many Cleared from Path of Heavy Champ, January 5, 1927
Menke Sees Operation as One hope for Dempsey: Recurrence of Old Ill Makes Jack Sick Man; Ex-Champ Insists He Needs No Surgical Treatment (Jack Dempsey), March 15, 1927
Dempsey Pins Hope On Bout About July 4: Ex-Champ Looking Over Sites for His Training Camp (Jack Dempsey), March 20, 1927
Dempsey-Sharkey Bout Appears Out of Question: Former King Says He Has 'Lost' Punch; But Sparring Mates Give Proof He Is Playing Possum, June 7, 1927
Menke Favors Dempsey by Knockout in Five Rounds: Expert Gives Reasons for Picking Jack; Says Tunney Can Not take a Shellacking Around Body (Dempsey vs. Tunney), September 22, 1927
Was Kelly Game? Fought Better Man He Wouldn't Quit Pounded to Death (Andy Kelly), December 11, 1927
Joe Jeannette One Battler McVey Couldn't Keep Down: Sam Knocked Him Down 36 Times In Bout; Wore Himself Out by Punching Fore and Resigned in 49th (Sam McVey/Joe Jeannette), February 2, 1928
Menke Figures Tom Will Win, (Gene Tunney vs. Tom Heeney), July 24, 1928
Dempsey Brought Success; Garden Claimed Credit(Sharkey-Stribling fight), April 4, 1929
Dempsey To Quit Promoting Fights: Will Forget All About It Unless Business Conditions Improve, May 15, 1930
Schmeling and Sharkey Start Getting Bold: They Expect Nothing Short of Murder When They Meet June 21, June 8, 1932
Max Baer Beats Fish Vender In 20-Round Tilt (Max Baer/King Levinsky), July 5, 1932
Farley Not to Resign As Head of Fight Board (James Farley), December 23, 1932

American Football
Sport Dope (Michalis Dorizas), November 5, 1914
Sport Dope (1914 College Football All-America Team), November 25, 1914
Sport Dope (1914 Michigan Wolverines football team), December 2, 1914
Mightiest Ground Gainers on Gridiron Depend Upon Strength of Line - Meinke: Greatest Halfback Dub On Grid Machine With Comparatively Weak Line (role of linemen), November 17, 1921
Stars Reap Golden Harvest For Few Minutes of Play: 'Bo' McMillan, Star of Centre College Team Offered $1,000 Per Game -- Jim Thorpe, the Great Indian Averages $1,000 For Each Engagement (birth of professional football), December 8, 1921
Veteran Football Officials Sidetracked for 'Fledglings' -- Critics Say: Holier-Than Thou Grid Nabobs Come In For Raking Over, January 23, 1922
Forward Pass Is Sad Failure in Offense, Says Meinke (Forward pass), November 13, 1922
Menke Comes to the Front, Praises Line That 'Helps' Backs (line for Notre Dame's Four Horsemen), December 25, 1924
Publicity Made Grange Great, Says Frank Menke: Illinois Star Good Only in Open Field Running and Is Not As Great As Tryon and Oberlander (Red Grange), December 11, 1925
College Football Steeped In Hypocrisy, Menke Cries, January 7, 1926
Heston Greatest Grid Star of All Time -- Yost (Willie Heston), November 2, 1926
Great Among the Greats, Says Menke of Rockne: Taught Army 'U' Value of Forward Pass; Combination With Dorais Brought Fame to Notre Dame (Knute Rockne), November 9, 1926
Menke Says Huddle System Should Be Barred: Asserts Game Needs Radical Improvement; Would Cut Number of Subs Used in Each Period, December 2, 1926
Wade and Assistants Have Great Record at Alabama: Coach's Easy Ways Keep His Record Hidden (Wallace Wade), December 11, 1926
Menke Charges Varsity Football Commercialized: Quotes W. Va. Wesleyan As Good Example; Says Larger Schools Must Pay More Than $500 for Stars (corruption in college football), January 7, 1927
'Cold' Football Players Easily Injured - Menke: I.N.S. Sports Editor Tells Of Own Observation of Cripplings, December 11, 1931
Lower Prices Real Cure For Football 'Evil': Menke Says High Prices Have Been Responsible For Present Conditions, December 20, 1931

Horse racing
In the World of Sport (call for reform in horse racing), March 13, 1915
Short Stories of the Track (Tod Sloan (jockey)), May 21, 1925
Moral of This Race Tip Is Plain to All (corruption in horse racing), October 17, 1925
Visit To Tijuana Sees Many Celebrities At Race Track, January 5, 1926
Whitney Horses Gallop Into Big Fortune Class (Harry Payne Whitney), November 8, 1926
 Breeder of Fine Derby Winners Returns to Racing: John Madden Famous for Sharp Trades; Bred Flying Ebony and Zev Among Other Turf Stars (John E. Madden), November 24, 1926

Other
With Menke At the Waldorf Gazing At The Big Smokes, December 12, 1913
Most Athletes Are Married Men: Formerly, The Reverse Was True, But Cupid Has Now Changed Things, March 5, 1914
Menke Sees Something Good in Yale After All -- Listen, April 24, 1916
Wealth of Croesus Plunged on Battle Between 'Scorpions': Pair of Tarantula Can Whip a Vinagaroon, Say Wager-Mad Sports Fiends and Battle Ground is Selected for Battle of Death -- Game is Run Secretly (new Texas "sport" matching tarantulas against vinegaroons), November 29, 1921
Standardization of Bowling Urged By 'Grand Old Man of Alleys': Alley Game Deals Old Pop Wallop, Says Expert (Joe Thum), February 7, 1922
Flying Falls Rule Sized Up As Catastrophe for Curley's Clique: Flying Falls Knock Pre-Arranged Bouts 'Gang Aglae' -- Claim (Jack Curley/pro wrestling), February 17, 1922
New York Sports Fans More Gullible Than Any, February 1, 1923
American Doctors Say Weak Hearts Killed Golfers Past Fifty, October 2, 1923
Suzanne Tennis Marvel Of All Time, Says Menke (Suzanne Lenglen), October 27, 1926
Joie Ray's Display of Courage Draws Tribute From Feature Writer: Frank G. Menke Has High Praise for Great Performance of Ray in Recent Boston Marathon -- Joie Came Out of Oblivion to Stage Fine Comeback (Joie Ray), May 18, 1928

References

1885 births
1954 deaths
Writers from Cleveland
Sportswriters from Ohio
Writers from Fairfield, Connecticut
Journalists from Ohio